Victor MacAuley (November 3, 1889 – July 24, 1968) was a Canadian long-distance runner. He competed in the marathon at the 1924 Summer Olympics.  McAuley was a five-time winner of the Halifax Marathon.  McAuley ran in the 1924 Paris Olympics and finished in 14th place.  He later coached Silas McLellan.

References

External links
 

1889 births
1968 deaths
Athletes (track and field) at the 1924 Summer Olympics
Canadian male long-distance runners
Canadian male marathon runners
Olympic track and field athletes of Canada
Sportspeople from Windsor, Ontario